Lotfi Achour (Arabic: لطفي عاشور) is a Tunisian writer, producer and director for theater and cinema. He is the author of more than 25 theater productions on different stages (London, Paris, Festival In d'Avignon, Tunis, Carthage, Hammamet, Byblos, Kinshasa, Yaoundé…). His last show was co-produced by the Royal Shakespeare Company for the 2012 Olympic Games London. In cinema, he produced three award-winning shorts presented at dozens of festivals, including Père nominated the 2017 Césars and La laine Sur Le Dos in official competition at Cannes in 2016, and nominated for the 2017 Academy Awards. In 2016, he directed and produced his first feature film, Demain Dès L'Aube.

Early life 

He was born in Bab Souika, an emblematic cultural area of the Medina of Tunis. Achour arrived in France at age twenty, where he attended Sorbonne University to pursue cinema and theater. He took part in the Varan workshops on documentary filmmaking.

Career 
He associated with the author Natacha Pontcharra, with whom he created a dozen texts in residence in various drama centers and national scenes, including La Chartreuse de Villeneuve Lez Avignon, where he directed three shows, including L’Angélie, a show created at the Avignon Festival in 1998, and billed as "The best show in Avignon festival", by Le Soir in Belgium. Achour thus became the first Tunisian director to occur in the "IN" of Avignon Festival.

Working in both Arabic and French, he designed and implemented international projects involving multidisciplinary artistic collaborations with artists from different nationalities and backgrounds. He ran the Rio Theatre in Grenoble for four years, making it exclusively for contemporary art and living artists.

He designed an installation for the Nuit Blanche in Paris 2006.

In 2009, he joined Anissa Daoud, actress and author, and created the APA, Artistes Producteurs Associés (Producers Artists Associated), a structure for innovative creation that produces movies, theater plays, and musical performances.

Personal life
Achour is married to a Russian playwright. His daughter Doria Achour is an actress and film director.

Cinema

Features 
 2016: Burning Hope (Demain dès l’aube)

Short movies 
 2006: Ordure
 2015: Père
 2016: La Laine sur le dos

Theatre 
 1991: Cet assassin-là vous aime (Written by Natacha de Pontcharra)
 1993: Œil de cyclone (Written by Natacha de Pontcharra)
 1994: La Gazelle et l'enfant (Written by Abdelwahab Meddeb)
 1994: Portrait d'art, baptême et mariage (Written by Natacha de Pontcharra)
 1995: Zeyneb (Written by d'Aroussia Nallouti)
 1996: Mickey la torche (Written by Natacha de Pontcharra)
 1997: La Trempe (Written by Natacha de Pontcharra)
 1998: L'Angélie (Written by Natacha de Pontcharra)
 2000: Dancing (Written by Natacha de Pontcharra)
 2000: Les Brûlants
 2000: Les Ratés (Written by Natacha de Pontcharra)
 2000: Essbaïhi (Written by Taoufik Jebali)
 2002: La Franchise c'est bien (Written by Natacha de Pontcharra)
 2002: Oum (Written by Adel Hakim)
 2004: La Traversée de Gibran Khalil Gibran (Music by Zad Moultaka)
 2006: Ichkabad (Written byTaoufik Jebali et Mohamed Raja Farhat)
 2007: La Comédie indigène
 2009: Hobb Story, Sex in the (Arab) City
 2012: Macbeth, Leïla and Ben: a Bloody History (coproduced by Royal Shakespeare Company)

References

Year of birth missing (living people)
Living people
Tunisian screenwriters
University of Paris alumni
Tunisian expatriates in France